Sam Branson Rayburn (born October 20, 1980) is a former American football defensive tackle. He was signed by the Philadelphia Eagles as an undrafted free agent in 2003. He played college football at the University of Tulsa.

Rayburn has also been a member of the San Francisco 49ers and Miami Dolphins.

High school career
Sam Rayburn was a member of the Chickasha High School football team, which was the 1997 and 1998 Oklahoma State runner-up. Chickasha lost both times to Oklahoma City Carl Albert High school. In those two years, the team went 25-3.

Professional career

Philadelphia Eagles
Rayburn joined the Philadelphia Eagles as an undrafted free agent from the University of Tulsa prior to the 2003 season. He played in 53 games and recorded 65 tackles and nine sacks with the Eagles from 2003 to 2006. He was released by the team on May 11, 2007.

San Francisco 49ers
On June 5, 2007, the San Francisco 49ers announced that they would sign Rayburn to a free agent contract. On September 1, 2007, he was released by the 49ers.

References

External links
 Philadelphia Eagles biography
 Tulsa biography

1980 births
Living people
People from Chickasha, Oklahoma
American football defensive tackles
Tulsa Golden Hurricane football players
Philadelphia Eagles players
San Francisco 49ers players
Miami Dolphins players